Nicolas Nancey, real name Nicolas Zouros, (1874  – 13 October 1925) was a French dramatist and screenwriter. Once referred to as a successor of Eugène Labiche and Georges Feydeau he has written 15 plays in the vaudeville as well as boulevard genre, in collaboration with dramatists such as Paul Armont, Henry de Gorsse or André Mouëzy-Éon.

Theatre 
 1916: La Ventouse, one-act play cowritten with Jean Manoussi
 1925: Un petit nez retroussé, comédie-vaudeville in four acts cowritten with André Birabeau

in collaboration with Paul Armont
 1905: Le Truc du Brésilien
 1906: Le Trèfle à quatre
 1909: Théodore et Cie
 1920: Le Zèbre

in collaboration with Jean Rioux
 1912: Pétoche, vaudeville in two acts
 1913: Monsieur le juge, vaudeville in four acts
 1914: Faute de grives, vaudeville in one act

in collaboration with André Mouëzy-Éon
 1919: L'Héritier du bal Tabarin
 1925: Il est cocu, le chef de gare

in collaboration with Henry de Gorsse
 1921: Trois poules pour un coq, vaudeville in 3 acts
 1921: Oscar ! Tu le seras, vaudeville in 3 acts
 1922: Le Coup d'Abélard, vaudeville in 3 acts
 1923: Un homme de paille, vaudeville in 3 acts
 La Petite Dame du wagon-lit

Filmography 
 1916: , directed by Filippo Castamagna, based on the play Le Truc du Brésilien
 1920: The Glad Eye, directed by Kenelm Foss and James Reardon, based on the play Le Zèbre
 1923: À la gare, directed by Robert Saidreau
 1925: Teodoro e socio, directed by Mario Bonnard, based on the play Théodore et Cie
 1927: The Glad Eye, directed by Maurice Elvey, based on the play Le Zèbre
 1932: Le Truc du Brésilien, directed by Alberto Cavalcanti, based on the play Le Truc du Brésilien
 1932: Ah!  Quelle gare!, directed by René Guissart, based on the play Il est cocu, le chef de gare
 1933: , directed by Pierre Colombier, based on the play Théodore et Cie
 1933: L'Héritier du bal Tabarin, directed by Jean Kemm, based on the play L'Héritier du bal Tabarin
 1936: La Petite Dame du wagon-lit, directed by Maurice Cammage, based on the play La Petite Dame du wagon-lit
 1939: Un mare di guai, directed by Carlo Ludovico Bragaglia, based on the play Théodore et Cie
 1941: Station Master, directed by Jan Sviták, based on the play Il est cocu, le chef de gare
 1946: , directed by Eduardo Boneo, based on the play Il est cocu, le chef de gare

References

External links 
 
 Filmographie

20th-century French dramatists and playwrights
20th-century French screenwriters
Writers from Marseille
1874 births
1925 deaths